Damaad is a 1978 Bollywood comedy film directed by Rajat Rakshit. It features Amol Palekar, Ranjeeta, Shreeram Lagoo, Tarla Mehta, Preeti Ganguly, Pinchoo Kapoor, Dina Pathak and Jagdeep. The movie is a remake of famous Bengali movie Mouchak.

Plot
Sharad (Amol Palekar) belongs to a middle-class family and lives with his brother Shreeram Lagoo and sister-in-law Tarla Mehta in Bombay. Sharad gets a job in Malavli in which he is not interested. He, however, does go for the job where he meets bosses Mr. Rodrigues and Mr. Choudhury, who are initially rude to him, but soften immediately and pamper him when they see he is unmarried. Both these men are on the look-out for grooms for their daughters. On the first day, Sharad's boss Pinchoo Kapoor takes him to his house for lunch where he is introduced to Leena Preeti Ganguly, the boss' fat daughter who promptly falls in love with him. Then, he gets introduced to Mr. Rodrigues' three daughters too. But Sharad is in love with Renu (Ranjeeta Kaur), his neighbour. In the factory, his assistant Mr. Khote (Ashok Saraf) wants to help him get out of the trap created by Mr. Chaudhury and Mr. Rodrigues. Khote spreads the rumour that Sharad is not of good character. This, however, creates tensions between Renu and Sharad. Mr. Chaudhury starts believing that Khote is spreading the rumours in order to win the place of his son-in-law. After a series of funny foibles and fumbles, all tensions are resolved.

Cast
Amol Palekar as Sharad Mazgaonkar
Ranjeeta Kaur as Renu
Shreeram Lagoo as Shreedhar Mazgaonkar
 Tarla Mehta as Mrs. Mazgaonkar, Sharad's bhabhi
 Jagdeep as Baankey the mad man in Malavli
Keshto Mukherjee as Tulsiram
Preeti Ganguli as Leena
Pinchoo Kapoor Mr. Chaudhary
Dina Pathak Mrs. Chaudhary
Datta Bhat Renu's father
Sunder as Dr.Chatterjee
Marutirao Parab as Mr. Rodrigues
C S Dubey as Sundarji Pandit
Ashok Saraf as Mr. Khote
Master Sakka as Sonu
Mushtaq Merchant as Charan
 Harbans Darshan M. Arora as neighbor who throws water on Charan

Soundtrack

Trivia
 Debut of Ashok Saraf in Hindi movies.

External links
 

1978 films
1970s Hindi-language films